Balkan Steel is a defunct basketball club based in Skopje, North Macedonia. They played in the Macedonian First League until the season 2002/2003.

Domestic Achievements

 Macedonian Basketball Cup Semi-finalist - 2003

Former players

 Gjorgji Talevski
 Risto Duganov
 Bojan Trajkovski
 Toni Grnčarov
 Joško Kafedzis
 Boris Nešović
 Darko Sokolov
 Zoran Nikolov
 Vasko Najkov
 Fore Kalpakov
 Borče Daskalovski
 Vladimir Georgievski
 Riste Stefanov
 Ilija Bocevski
 Vladimir Đokić
 Zoran Gavrilović
 Vlada Krupniković
 Igor Ratković
 Blaž Ručigaj

Former coaches
 Jordančo Davitkov
 Saša Dimitirijević

References

External links
 KK Balkan Steel Eurobasket Profile

Basketball teams in North Macedonia